Holiday Hotel (French title:L'Hôtel de la plage) is a 1978 French comedy film directed and written by Michel Lang. The film stars Sophie Barjac and Myriam Boyer on a summer holiday in Brittany.

Cast

Controversy
The uncensored broadcast of the movie by TV5 Monde on 7 June 2015 in Indonesia led to the banning of the channel by Indonesian authority.

References

External links 

Turner Classic Movies overview

1978 films
1970s sex comedy films
Films set in hotels
Films set on beaches
French sex comedy films
1970s French-language films
Films about vacationing
1978 comedy films
Films directed by Michel Lang
1970s French films